Jean-Guy Paré (November 24, 1947 - December 26, 2020) was a Quebec politician, he was the former Mayor of Saint-Pierre-les-Becquets from 2008 to 2013, he previously served as the member for Lotbinière in the Quebec National Assembly as a member of the Parti Québécois from 1994 until 2003.

Biography
Paré was born in Warwick He obtained a Bachelor of Education in Physical Education in 1972. Completing his master's degree in Sports Science and Social Psychology, at Dalhousie University in 1976. He obtained a certificate in sports training in from the Université du Québec à Trois-Rivières and obtained a master's degree in Public Administration from the National School of Public Administration.

He served as a professor of physical activity from 1972 to 1984, also serving as Head coach of the Les Diablos football team at Cégep de Trois-Rivières. He later served as executive director of the Training and Development Corporation at the same college and then became a Training services coordinator for various CEGEPs.

Political career

Paré served as a city councillor of Les Becquets from 1979 until 1989, He ran in the 1994 Quebec provincial election for the seat of Lotbinière and won by 283 votes over the incumbent Lewis Camden. He served as a backbench supporter in the government and was re-elected in 1989, he served in various parliamentary secretary roles in the governments of Jacques Parizeau, Lucien Bouchard and Bernard Landry.

He was re-elected easily in 1998. He became chairman of the Committee on Public Finance. He was defeated in the 2003 election by Sylvie Roy of the Action démocratique du Québec.

After losing re-election, he worked as a Senior Counsellor for the Cégeps of Drummondville, Shawinigan, Trois-Rivières and Victoriaville. Before running in the Saint-Pierre-les-Becquets mayoral by-election to replace the late Raymond Dion. Paré won and served out the rest of the term before running un-opposed for re-election. He chose not to run for re-election in 2013.

Electoral Record

Provincial

References 

1947 births
Living people
Canadian educators
Dalhousie University alumni
Mayors of places in Quebec
Parti Québécois MNAs
Quebec municipal councillors
People from Centre-du-Québec
Université du Québec à Montréal alumni
Université du Québec à Trois-Rivières alumni
20th-century Canadian politicians
21st-century Canadian politicians